Athboy RFC is an Irish rugby team based in Athboy, County Meath, playing in Division 3 of the Leinster League. The club colours are red, purple and black.

History

Athboy Rugby Football Club was founded in 1978 and the subsequent years have been tough but rewarding time for those who originally came together in the town with the idea of establishing the oval ball game in the area and indeed the many people who have come along since. Edmund Carroll from Athboy and local Vet Rafe Warner were both instrumental in the formation of the club which boasted, in its first year, one team and about a dozen alickadoos, The initial season of 1978–79 constituted a series of friendlies but in the summer of 1979 the club was officially affiliated to the Leinster Branch of the IRFU.

Since its establishment, the club has had its ups and downs, coming from small beginnings to grow into a progressive unit playing at both Junior 3 and 4 level. In the 1995–96 season when the club failed to field a team for the first time since 1978, senior rugby activity was suspended. In the 1999–2000 season, sufficient numbers of players and interest resulted in a re-launch at J3 level and the addition of a women's team, later in that season.

Success on the field has brought home 5 trophies, those 5 triumphs – 4 in the Magee Cup (North-East J3 League) 1987,1988 & 1990 and 2010 and the Michael Dunne Cup (Provincial J4) in 1982. Playing as a Junior 4 side the club only had to wait 3 seasons before bringing home the first trophy home to the Bawn Inn where the club was then based. It may have taken a replay to see off Kilkenny in the Dunne Cup Final but the 10–6 victory was a great boost for a fledgling club and the Jimmy McCann led XV was toasted at many celebrations in the following weeks.

With growing success in area and provincial rugby the club sought and was granted by the Leinster Branch a move up to Junior 3 in 1982. A second XV was started and the club boasted up to 40 players and several officials. With the club finding success on the field the decision was taken to locate to a new home and this was achieved when land was acquired on the edge of the town . The 2 teams began playing there in 1986 and over £2000 was spent installing floodlights for training.

The Clubs 1stXV currently play in Division 2b of the Leinster League

In the summer of 1999 a meeting was held with the aim of fielding again at senior level this was achieved with a mixture of players who had played both at senior and underage level for the club plus several who had moved into the area and a few new recruits to the oval ball. As with the first team the new team spent its first year playing friendlies and in the 2000–01 season played in the Provincial Thirds League, The Anderson Cup and the Dunne Cup. The Women's team was also started in 1999–00 season playing a number of friendlies and played in the National Conference in 2000–01

In 2001–2002 season the women's XV shared the All Ireland League Division 3 title with Trinity College and the following year lost out in an all Meath final against Navan

Since 1985 Athboy has had fielded under 10's and 12 teams and this has grown to include under 8's under 14's,16's and in 03/04 an Under 18's (in conjunction with Ardee) The 18's went on to win leinster Under 18's Division 1 the same season.

Several players have gone on to represent Leinster at several levels including U17, U18, Women's U19, Women's Leinster B and the Senior Leinster Women's Team also former player Richie Feeney (now UL Bohs) made his Ireland U19 debut V England in 2004.

The membership of the club reflects a broad level of interest in rugby throughout the area with players from Athboy, Trim and other parts of South Meath.

Silverware success

Success on the field has brought home 8 trophies, those 8 triumphs- 5 in the Magee Cup (North-East J3 League) 1987, 1988, 1990, 2010 and 2011 and the Michael Dunne Cup (Provincial J4) in 1982, The 2003 Women's AIL Division 3 and the 2004 Under 18's Division 1 . Playing as a Junior 4 side the club only had to wait 3 seasons before bringing home the first trophy home to the Bawn Inn where the club was then based. It may have taken a replay to see off Kilkenny in the Dunne Cup Final but the 10–6 victory was a great boost for a fledgling club and the Jimmy McCann led XV.

With growing success in area and provincial rugby the club sought and was granted by the Leinster Branch a move up to Junior 3 in 1982. A second XV was started and the club boasted up to 40 players and several officials. With the club finding success on the field the decision was taken to locate to a new home and this was achieved when land was acquired on the edge of the town . The 2 teams began playing there in 1986 and over £2000 was spent installing floodlights for training.

In the summer of 1999 a meeting was held with the aim of fielding again at senior level this was achieved with a mixture of players who had played both at senior  and underage level for the club plus several who had moved into the area and a few new recruits to the oval ball. As with the first team the new team spent its first year playing friendlies and in the 2000–01 season played in the Provincial Thirds League, The Anderson Cup and the Dunne Cup.

Women's team

The Women's team was also started in 1999–00 season playing a number of friendlies and played in the National Conference in 2000–01. In the 2001–02 season the women's XV shared the All Ireland League Division 3 title with Trinity College coached by Raymond Finegan. The following year they lost out in an all Meath All Ireland final against Navan

The membership of the club reflects a broad level of interest in rugby throughout the area with players from Athboy, Trim and other parts of South Meath.

Roll of Honour

Michael Dunne Cup 1982.

Magee Cup 1987,1988, 1990, 2010, 2011.

Women's All Ireland League Division 3 2002.

Leinster U18's Division 1 2004

References
 Webpage 

Irish rugby union teams
Rugby clubs established in 1978
Rugby union clubs in County Meath